George Schoener, or Georg Schöner (March 21, 1864 - October 2, 1941) was a German-born Roman Catholic priest who became known in the United States as the "Padre of the Roses" for his experiments in rose breeding, especially in the use of wild species. Only two of his creations survive today, however: 'Arrilaga' and 'Schoener's Nutkana'.

He was born into a peasant family of Steinach, Baden. He studied in Engelberg and Einsiedeln from 1883 to 1889. An aunt enabled him to emigrate to America, where he became a priest in Pittsburgh, Pennsylvania. Afflicted with illnesses, he ended up in Brooks, Oregon in 1911, where the rose growing activity in nearby Portland caught his interest. He searched the nearby hills for specimens of wild  species such as Rosa nutkana.

A fire in 1915 destroyed church and house, and in 1917 he moved to Santa Barbara, California.

In 1939 he took up a position at Santa Clara University in Santa Clara, California, but died just two years later.

The Georg-Schöner-Schule, a primary school in his hometown, Steinach, is named after him.

See also
List of Roman Catholic scientist-clerics

Notes

External links 
 Online bio, with pictures
 Another bio (in German)

1864 births
1941 deaths
People from Ortenaukreis
People from the Grand Duchy of Baden
American Roman Catholic priests
American botanists
Rose breeders
German emigrants to the United States
Catholic clergy scientists
People from Marion County, Oregon
Catholics from Oregon